Vărvăreuca is a commune in Floreşti District, Moldova. It is composed of two villages, Stîrceni and Vărvăreuca.

References

Communes of Florești District